Soul Muzik is a Nigerian entertainment company founded in 2008. It is co-owned by singer-songwriter Darey.
Three albums have been released by Soul Muzik, including four singles: "Lolola", "Totally Yours" (which features Wayne Wonder), "Smile" and "Never Going Down" by signees Zaina Agoro and Mo Eazy respectively.

History
Although birthed and rooted in Nigeria, Soul Muzik has branches and affiliates in the United States and the United Kingdom. In early 2009, Soul Muzik hired Dick Griffey (former Soul Train executive) as label chairman. Griffey offered to produce Darey's third album, but died before the project was completed.

Soul Muzik is home to co-owner Darey himself and most recently, Mo Eazy and Zaina Agoro.

The latest release under the company is a new single by Darey titled "Special Fever" and a brand new video by Zaina Agoro featuring Wayne Wonder titled "Totally Yours".

References

External links 

 

Nigerian record labels
Entertainment companies established in 2008
2008 establishments in Nigeria